Ellyn is a given name. Notable people with the name include:

Ellyn Setnor Bogdanoff (born 1959), Representative in the House of Representatives of the U.S. state of Florida
Ellyn Stern, professional actress, voice actress, and director in California

See also
Glen Ellyn, Illinois, affluent village in DuPage County, Illinois, United States
Glen Ellyn (Metra), station on Metra's Union Pacific/West Line
Glen Ellyn Main Street Historic District, set of eleven buildings
Village Links of Glen Ellyn, public golf course